Cavilaelaps is a genus of mites in the family Laelapidae.

Species
 Cavilaelaps breslaui Fonseca, 1935

References

Laelapidae